Matej Grešák (born 31 May 1999) is a Slovak professional footballer who plays as a midfielder for Železiarne Podbrezová.

Club career

1. FC Tatran Prešov
Grešák made his Fortuna Liga debut for Tatran Prešov against ŽP Šport Podbrezová on 10 December 2016.

References

External links
 Fortuna Liga profile 
 
 Futbalnet profile 

1999 births
Living people
People from Prešov District
Sportspeople from the Prešov Region
Slovak footballers
Slovakia youth international footballers
Association football midfielders
1. FC Tatran Prešov players
FK Poprad players
FK Železiarne Podbrezová players
Slovak Super Liga players
2. Liga (Slovakia) players